The 2018 Rock N Roll Tequila 170 presented by Amethyst Beverage was the 21st stock car race of the 2018 NASCAR Xfinity Series season, and the sixth iteration of the event. The race was held on Saturday, August 11, 2018, in Lexington, Ohio at the Mid-Ohio Sports Car Course, a 2.258 miles (3.634 km) permanent road course. The race took the scheduled 75 laps to complete. At race's end, Justin Allgaier of JR Motorsports would pass a dominating Austin Cindric from Team Penske with new tires to win his eighth career NASCAR Xfinity Series win and his third of the season. To fill out the podium, Daniel Hemric of Richard Childress Racing would finish third.

Background 

The track is a road course auto racing facility located in Troy Township, Morrow County, Ohio, United States, just outside the village of Lexington. Mid-Ohio has also colloquially become a term for the entire north-central region of the state, from south of Sandusky to the north of Columbus.

The track opened as a 15-turn, 2.4 mile (3.86 km) road circuit run clockwise. The back portion of the track allows speeds approaching 180 mph (290 km/h). A separate starting line is located on the backstretch to allow for safer rolling starts. The regular start / finish line is located on the pit straight. There is grandstand seating for 10,000 spectators and three observation mounds alongside the track raise the capacity to over 75,000.

Entry list

Practice

First practice 
The first practice session would occur on Friday, August 10, at 1:35 PM EST and would last for one hour and 20 minutes.

Second and final practice 
The second and final practice session, sometimes referred to as Happy Hour, would occur on Friday, August 10, at 4:05 PM EST and would last for 50 minutes. As rain would hinder the session, only five cars would make a lap.

Qualifying 
Qualifying was held on Saturday, August 11, at 11:30 AM EST. Since the Mid-Ohio Sports Car Course is a road course, the qualifying system was a multi-car system that included two rounds. The first round was 25 minutes, where every driver would be able to set a lap within the 25 minutes. Then, the second round would consist of the fastest 12 cars in Round 1, and drivers would have 10 minutes to set a lap. Whoever set the fastest time in Round 2 would win the pole.

No drivers would fail to qualify.

Full qualifying results

Race results 
Stage 1 Laps: 20

Stage 2 Laps: 20

Stage 3 Laps: 35

References 

2018 NASCAR Xfinity Series
NASCAR races at Mid-Ohio Sports Car Course
August 2018 sports events in the United States
2018 in sports in Ohio